Pip Ahoy! is a British children's animated television series aimed at preschoolers following the adventures of a puppy named Pip and his best friend, a kitten named Alba, who live in Salty Cove. The series originally aired on Milkshake! on Channel 5. Cartoon Network UK's sister pre-school channel Cartoonito premiered Pip Ahoy! on 2 March 2015. The first two series were originally shown on Channel 5's Milkshake!. A third series began airing on ITVBe's pre-school block LittleBe in September 2018. Animation created by Charles Ward.

Characters
Pip (voiced by Teresa Gallagher) – A lovable sea puppy.
Alba (voiced by Emma Tate) – Pip's best friend. She is a kitten.
Skipper (voiced by David Jason) – An old sea dog who is a lighthouse keeper. He is Pip's uncle.
Hopper (voiced by Jimmy Hibbert) – A one-legged Seagull.
Pasty (voiced by David Jason) – A little crab.
Shelvis (voiced by Jimmy Hibbert) – A busy hermit crab.
Billy (voiced by Emma Tate) - A badger younger than Pip and Alba.
Aisha and Amir (voiced by Teresa Gallagher and Emma Tate respectively) - Two fox twins who like to cause mischief.
The Squiblets – A cluster of little shells who love to sing about the day's event.
Mr. Morris Maurice (voiced by David Jason) – A green parrot with a Welsh accent who is the driver of the Bubble Train.
Mrs. Marjorie Twitcher (voiced by Emma Tate) – A cat who drives a taxi. She is Alba's auntie.
Madame Francois Eclair (voiced by Emma Tate) – A female poodle with a French accent who runs the Cake Shop.
Mrs. Alice Finn (voiced by Emma Tate) - A female polar bear with an Irish accent who runs both the Seaside Shop and a juice stall.
Etienne (voiced by Teresa Gallagher) - Madame Eclair's nephew, who is often found in his buggy either sleeping or crying.
Captain Bilge, Trelawney and Number 3, the Mice Pirates (voiced by Jimmy Hibbert, Emma Tate and David Jason respectively) – Three pirates who like hunting for treasure. They let Pip join their crew once, and still occasionally visit Salty Cove.
Alan (voiced by Jimmy Hibbert) – A little penguin who likes bouncing.
Professor Evie (voiced by Emma Tate) – A female meerkat with a Scottish accent who is a scientist, and has a submarine.
Mr. and Mrs Snail (voiced by Jimmy Hibbert and Teresa Gallagher) – Two semi-unfriendly snails. Mr. Snail wears a smart suit, has a brown moustache and speaks in a Manchester accent. Mrs Snail wears a smart woman's dress, has lipstick and speaks in a Manchester accent.
Aubrey Snail (voiced by Teresa Gallagher) – Norman's son.
Fuchsia (voiced by Stacey Solomon) – A pink flamingo who is part of a pop group known as The Flaming Pinks.
Kevin, Cyril and Percy (voiced by Jimmy Hibbert, David Jason and Teresa Gallagher) – Three naughty gulls.
Meryl (voiced by Teresa Gallagher) - A mermaid who is rather fussy.
Jonesy (voiced by Jimmy Hibbert) - A Welsh seal who is Meryl's friend.
Esme (voiced by Teresa Gallagher) - An American whale who occasionally visits Salty Cove.
The Rocktopus (voiced by David Jason) – A purple octopus who lives under the sea, and likes drumming.

Production

Development
Pip Ahoy originated as The Salties around 1995, while the creator was reading bedtime stories to his boys James and Freddie, during his annual holiday to Salcombe. Assisted by his wife Katie, he recorded the stories in a small red book, in the hope that they would be published one day. The red book lay in a drawer for 10 years until 2005, when Katie and Ward decided that The Salties should become reality. In 2007, Charles meet Francis Fitzpatrick and formed a partnership to promote The Salties around the world. Ward and Francis pitched The Salties to many Animation Studios such as HiT Entertainment only to see rejection, but sometime in 2011 Ward received a call from Francis to say that he’d just had met someone while attending Kidscreen in New York who thought Cosgrove Hall might be interested and in around February 2011, France and Charles meet the Cosgrove team at the premises of 422 TV in Manchester. 

A few weeks later, France and Charles meet some of Cosgrove Hall’s ex-employees, who had been asked to come up with some new ideas. Mark Hall explained that he felt we should keep “Captain’ (now called ‘Skipper’) was a grandfather type character and would become the narrator of the stories. Cosgrove Hall had a fine reputation for storytelling and it seemed they would call upon the best for The Salties. Mark and Brian had also introduced a brand new character, called Pip and he was told that pre-school children needed to see a character of approximately their own age, so Pip was born.

Eventually CHF Entertainment was Formed and Pip Ahoy! went into Production in November 2011.

Episodes

Series 1 (2014)

Series 2 (2015)

Christmas Special (2015)

Series 3 (2018)

References

External links
IMDb
Cosgrove, Hall Fitzpatrick Entertainment: Pip Ahoy!

2014 British television series debuts
2018 British television series endings
2010s British children's television series
2010s British animated television series
British children's animated adventure television series
British flash animated television series
Television series by Cosgrove Hall Films
British preschool education television series
Animated preschool education television series
2010s preschool education television series
Animated television series about cats
Animated television series about children
Animated television series about dogs
English-language television shows